Fairview, also known as the George Harbert Farm, is a historic home and farm located near Middletown, New Castle County, Delaware. It was built about 1840 and is a two-story, five bay, stuccoed brick dwelling in a subdued Greek Revival style. It has a hipped roof, a rear wing, and a center-passage plan.

It was listed on the National Register of Historic Places in 1987.

References

Houses on the National Register of Historic Places in Delaware
Farms on the National Register of Historic Places in Delaware
Greek Revival houses in Delaware
Houses completed in 1840
Houses in New Castle County, Delaware
National Register of Historic Places in New Castle County, Delaware